The Sumatran short-tailed python (Python curtus) is a species of the family Pythonidae, a nonvenomous snake native to Sumatra.

Taxonomy

Python curtus was the scientific name proposed by Hermann Schlegel in 1872 for a python with a short tail from Sumatra. The type locality is Sumatra.

Description

The Sumatran short-tailed python has narrow subocular scales between the bottom of the eye and the top of the labial scales. The parietal scales do not join each other. P. curtus and P. breitensteini can be distinguished by the frontal and parietal scales on the tops of their heads. In both P. brongersmai and P. breitensteini, the parietal scales join.
The tail is extremely short relative to the overall length. The color pattern consists of a beige, tan, or grayish-brown ground color overlaid with blotches that are brick- to blood-red in color.

Distribution and habitat
The Sumatran short-tailed python occurs in Sumatra, Riau Archipelago, Lingga Islands, Bangka Islands, Mentawai Islands and Kalimantan.
It inhabits rainforests, marshes, swamps, and the vicinity of river banks and streams.

Diet
They feed on a variety of mammals and birds.

Reproduction
Oviparous, females seldom lay more than a dozen large eggs (however, much larger clutches have been reported). The female remains coiled around the eggs during the incubation period, and may shiver to produce heat.

Uses
The species is kept as an exotic pet. They are often regarded as unpredictable and aggressive, but captive-bred individuals tend to be more docile than wild-caught specimens.

The Sumatran short-tailed python has been extensively harvested for leather; an estimated 100,000 individuals are taken for this purpose each year. The commercial trade regards the various populations of P. curtus and P. brongersmai as a single species. Authors who elevate particular island populations to species status note that the skins are readily distinguished.

References

External links

 

curtus
Reptiles of Indonesia
Reptiles described in 1872
Snakes of Asia